Dana A. Deshler (April 8, 1937 – September 16, 2012) was a former member of the Ohio House of Representatives.

References

Republican Party members of the Ohio House of Representatives
2012 deaths
1937 births